Atacicept is a recombinant fusion protein designed to inhibit B cells, thereby suppressing autoimmune disease. The designer protein combines the binding site for two cytokines that regulate maturation, function, and survival of B cells - B-lymphocyte stimulator (BLyS) and A proliferation-inducing ligand (APRIL), with the constant region of immunoglobin. Atacicept blocks activation of B cells by the tumor necrosis factor receptor superfamily member 13B (more commonly known as TACI), a transmembrane receptor protein found predominantly on the surface of B cells. Like the monoclonal antibody belimumab, atacicept blocks the binding of BLyS, but it also blocks APRIL. Binding of these TACI ligands induces proliferation, activation, and longevity of B cells and thus their production of autoantibodies. Atacicept is thought to selectively impair mature B cells and plasma cells with less impact on progenitor cells and memory B cells.

Studies have looked at atacicept in animal models of autoimmune disease and in patients with systemic lupus erythematosus (SLE), rheumatoid arthritis (RA), and optic neuritis. A phase II/III trial for systemic lupus erythematosus is due to run from 2008 to 2012. The subcutaneously injected protein failed a phase II trial for multiple sclerosis. The trials of atacicept in people with MS were suspended when some people taking the drug in one trial had an unexpected increase in inflammatory activity. An independent data monitoring board for the MS study found "subjects receiving atacicept were having more relapses and new MRI lesions than those on the placebo."

The drug is also being studied for treatment of B-cell malignancies, including multiple myeloma, B-cell chronic lymphocytic leukemia, and non-Hodgkin's lymphoma.

Atacicept was developed by a Seattle-based biotech company, ZymoGenetics, which handed the product over to Merck Serono for further development.

References 

Engineered proteins
Merck brands